Tesla is an American rock band from Sacramento, California. In late 1981, bassist Brian Wheat and guitarist Frank Hannon formed a band named City Kidd, which evolved into Tesla. By 1984, vocalist Jeff Keith, guitarist Tommy Skeoch, and drummer Troy Luccketta had joined the band, forming their classic lineup that appeared on all of the albums and live shows during their initial run. The band adopted the Tesla moniker shortly before recording their first album, as another band with a similar name already existed.

Their debut album, Mechanical Resonance, was released in 1986, which produced two hit singles, "Modern Day Cowboy" and their cover of "Little Suzi" (originally by Ph.D.). The band's second album The Great Radio Controversy (1989), peaked at number 18 on the Billboard 200 album chart, and produced the top-ten single "Love Song". During the height of the popularity of MTV Unplugged, the band recorded and released their third album, the live acoustic album Five Man Acoustical Jam in 1990. The album peaked at number 12 on the Billboard 200 and produced their top-charting single (number 8 on the Billboard Hot 100), "Signs", a cover of a song by the Five Man Electrical Band. Their follow-up fourth album, Psychotic Supper (1991) peaked at number 13, but lacked a hit single, similarly their next album, 1994's Bust a Nut did well enough on the album charts, peaking at number 20, but also lacked any radio hits. The band broke up in 1996, but returned in 2000 with a live tour and album, both named Replugged. They have continued to record and tour, though Skeoch left in 2006 and was replaced by Dave Rude on guitars. Their most recent release is the single "Time to Rock!", released in June, 2022.

They have sold at least 14 million albums in the United States.  The band is ranked at No. 22 on VH1's 100 Greatest Artists of Hair Metal, and have been described as a "thinking man's hair metal band".

History

Formation and Mechanical Resonance (1981–1988)
The band City Kidd was renamed Tesla during the recording of their first album, 1986's Mechanical Resonance, on the advice of their manager that City Kidd was not a great name (in addition, there was already another band going by that name). The band derived their name, certain album and song titles, and some song content from events relating to inventor and electrical engineer Nikola Tesla. Along with the band's next two studio albums, Mechanical Resonance was produced by Michael Barbiero and Steve Thompson.

The band's original line-up consisted of lead vocalist Jeff Keith, guitarists Frank Hannon and Tommy Skeoch, bassist Brian Wheat, and drummer Robert Contreras, who was soon replaced by ex-Eric Martin Band drummer Troy Luccketta.

In the early days of their career, Tesla toured with David Lee Roth, Alice Cooper, Def Leppard, and Poison, which resulted in the band being categorized as a glam metal band. The band's members resented this labelling. The band, according to Troy Luccketta, now does not mind being called a part of that scene.

The band released Mechanical Resonance LIVE on August 26, 2016, featuring live versions of every song from the original album, including a bonus track, "Save That Goodness," produced by Def Leppard guitarist Phil Collen.

The Great Radio Controversy and Psychotic Supper (1989–1993)
The band released their second album, The Great Radio Controversy, in 1989. The album helped solidify the band's growing reputation and fan base, and produced five hit singles, including the power ballad "Love Song".

In 1990, Tesla released Five Man Acoustical Jam, a live album featuring acoustic renditions of hits such as "Comin' Atcha Live", "Gettin' Better", "Modern Day Cowboy", and "Love Song". The album also featured a number of covers most notably a version of "Signs", a 1971 hit by the Five Man Electrical Band.

In 1991, the band released their third studio album Psychotic Supper. The band itself considers this to be their best album according to their official web site. The 1998 Japanese reissue import of Psychotic Supper contains one previously unreleased song, "Rock the Nation", as well as the songs "I Ain't Superstitious", and "Run Run Run", both of which had only been previously available as b-sides to two singles from The Great Radio Controversy.

Bust a Nut and hiatus (1994–1996)
In 1994, the band released their fourth studio album Bust a Nut. The Japanese edition of Bust a Nut contains the previously unreleased cover of Led Zeppelin's "The Ocean".

After the release of Bust a Nut, Skeoch departed because of his struggle with substance abuse. He rejoined after completing rehab, only to depart again months later. The band moved forward as a four-piece for a short while. However, it wasn't long before Skeoch briefly joined up with solo artist Marshall Coleman's band to support his solo career, only to see a departure of Marshall soon after. This band eventually morphed to include Jeff Keith and resurfaced as Bar 7 with a single "Four Leaf Clover", from the album The World Is a Freak. Brian Wheat formed Soulmotor and Frank Hannon formed Moon Dog Mane, while Troy Luccketta worked with several local artists including the Bay Area's One Thin Dime.

Reunion, Into the Now and Real to Reel (2000–2007)
After a break of six years, the Sacramento Bee reported that the band had reformed in 2000 with the help of local radio personality Pat Martin of KRXQ. The band played an emotional sold-out show at ARCO Arena in Sacramento on October 25, 2000. Soon after they recorded the double live album Replugged Live. In 2002 they were featured in the Rock Never Stops Tour alongside other 1980s rock bands.

2002 saw the release of a further live album Standing Room Only which is just a single CD version of Replugged Live.

In 2004, they released their fifth studio album Into the Now which debuted on the Billboard album chart at number 30. The album was well received by fans and the band was featured on Jimmy Kimmel Live!.

In the summer of 2006, the band embarked on the Electric Summer Jam Tour without guitarist Tommy Skeoch. Skeoch had left the band indefinitely to spend time with his family, and, as he later revealed on "The Classic Metal Show", other reasons; particularly his continuing problems with substance abuse.
Scott Johnson of the Sacramento band Rogue filled in for a time on this tour. Eventually Dave Rude replaced Skeoch permanently.

Tesla recorded a two-volume collection of cover songs titled Real to Reel, which was released on June 5, 2007. The recording is available as a 2-CD set. The first CD (containing 13 songs) is sold in a case with a blank slot for the second CD. The second CD (containing 12 additional songs) will initially be available to concert goers in the US at no additional charge beyond the cost of a ticket. The second CD was also given away with the August edition of Classic Rock magazine in Europe.

At the end of August, Tesla announced their first world tour in 16 years with dates in Australia, Japan, and Europe in October and November 2007.

Forever More and Twisted Wires (2008–2012)

In June and July 2008, Tesla played a few shows in Europe and the US, including Sweden Rock Festival, Graspop Metal Meeting and Rocklahoma. On July 15, 2008 "Tesla- Comin' Atcha Live! 2008" was released from a live concert filmed February 22, 2008 at the sold out Myth Nightclub in Maplewood, Minnesota.  The 2-hour show included hits "Modern Day Cowboy", "Love Song" and "Song and Emotion" along with additional backstage footage.

On August 11, 2008, it was reported that Tesla's next album, entitled Forever More, would be released on October 7 on their own record label, Tesla Electric Company Recordings. The album was produced by Terry Thomas, who produced Bust a Nut. The band aired the album's first single, "I Wanna Live" on radio stations across the globe on August 18 and kicked off a world tour on October 1. Forever More debuted No. 33 on The Billboard 200 chart and spawned singles "I Wanna Live", "Fallin' Apart" and "Breakin' Free".

On May 10, 2011, the band played at a rally for the Sacramento Kings of the National Basketball Association. Tesla performed two songs, "Signs" and "Love Song" during the Kings #HereWeRally at Cesar Chavez Park in Sacramento, California to celebrate the team staying in Sacramento for at least one more year.

On July 12, 2011, they released a mostly acoustic album titled Twisted Wires and the Acoustic Sessions.

Simplicity and Shock (2013–present)
In June 2013, Tesla released a new single "Taste My Pain" on iTunes. They released their new album Simplicity on June 6, 2014.

In 2015, the band did a tour with Def Leppard and Styx.

On August 26, 2016, Tesla released Mechanical Resonance Live in celebration of the album's 30th anniversary. It included a new single "Save That Goodness", written and produced by Phil Collen of Def Leppard.

In April 2017, Tesla began working on their ninth studio album, Shock, which was produced by Phil Collen, and released on March 8, 2019.

Tesla released the one-off single "Cold Blue Steel" in August 2021, followed a year later by "Time to Rock!".

Charity work
While promoting their album The Great Radio Controversy, the band participated in a canned food drive that allowed free concert admission to contributors, this event was incorporated into the video for "The Way It Is".
In February 2005, Tesla headlined a benefit show at the PPAC in Providence, Rhode Island, for the victims of the Station nightclub fire. During the show the band auctioned off an autographed acoustic guitar, with the proceeds going to the Station Family Fund. 100% of the ticket sales also went to this charity.

In February 2008, Tesla helped fund and headlined a benefit concert for victims of the Station nightclub fire. The show was broadcast by VH1 Classic. Tesla played three songs: "What You Give", "Signs", and "Love Song", though "What You Give" did not make it onto the broadcast.

Musical style
Tesla's music is generally categorized as hair/glam metal, heavy metal, and hard rock.

The band's first two albums were recorded with a typical 1980s glam metal sound, but with Mechanical Resonance having some elements of hard rock, and The Great Radio Controversy having some elements of blues. Psychotic Supper marked a slight change to a more bluesy and acoustic sound, but with their traditional pop-metal sound staying.

Band members
Current members
 Brian Wheat – bass, backing vocals, keyboards, piano (1981–1996, 2000–present)
 Frank Hannon – guitar, backing vocals, keyboards, piano, organ, theremin, bass, mandolin, harmonica (1981–1996, 2000–present)
 Jeff Keith – lead vocals (1984–1996, 2000–present)
 Troy Luccketta – drums, percussion (1984–1996, 2000–present)
 Dave Rude – guitar, backing vocals, bass (2006–present)

Touring substitutes
 Stefano Pasta – drums, percussion (1990; substituted for Luccketta for a brief period)
 Tommy Armstrong-Leavitt – guitar, backing vocals (2013; substitute for Dave Rude)
 Phil Collen – guitar, backing vocals (2016; substitute for Dave Rude at The Classic Rock Awards 2016)
 Ray Luzier – drums, percussion (2016; substitute for Troy Luccketta at The Classic Rock Awards 2016)
 Steve Brown – drums, percussion (2021–present; substitute for Troy Luccketta)

Former members
 Steve Clausman (1981)
 Bobby Contreras – drums (1981)
 Colleen Lloy – guitar, lead vocals (1981–1983; joined band with Brook Bright as City Kidd)
 Brook Bright – guitar, vocals (1981–1983; formed band as City Kidd in early 1980s)
 Jeff Harper – lead vocals (original lead vocalist for Earthshaker and City Kidd until April 1983)
 Joey Murrieta – guitar (1983; before the breakout of Tesla)
 Curtis Chapman – guitar (1983–1984; before the breakout of Tesla, when they were still called City Kidd)
 Tommy Skeoch – guitar, backing vocals (1984–1994, 1995, 2000–2006)

Timeline

Discography 

Studio albums
 Mechanical Resonance (1986)
 The Great Radio Controversy (1989)
 Psychotic Supper (1991)
 Bust a Nut (1994)
 Into the Now (2004)
 Real to Reel (2007)
Real to Reel, Vol. 2 (2007)
 Forever More (2008)
 Twisted Wires & the Acoustic Sessions (2011)
Simplicity (2014)
 Shock (2019)

See also
List of glam metal bands and artists
List of hard rock musicians

References

External links

 
 

Geffen Records artists
Glam metal musical groups from California
Hard rock musical groups from California
Heavy metal musical groups from California
Musical groups from Sacramento, California
Musical groups established in 1981
Musical groups disestablished in 1996
Musical groups reestablished in 2000